The 2001 OFC U-17 Championship was the 9th edition of the OFC U-17 Championship, the biennial international youth football championship organised by OFC for the men's under-17 national teams of Oceania. Vanuatu and Samoa each hosted one group in the group stage, while the final was played over two legs in the qualifying countries: Australia and New Zealand.

A total of ten teams played in the tournament, following the withdrawals of Cook Islands and New Caledonia. Defending champions Australia retained their title after defeating New Zealand 9–0 on aggregate in the final.

Group stage

Group 1

Group 2

Final

First leg

Second leg

References

External links
 Oceania Football Confederation website

OFC U-17 Championship
2001 in youth association football